Mauro Ramos de Oliveira (30 August 1930 – 18 September 2002), known as Mauro Ramos or simply Mauro, was a Brazilian professional association footballer. He played as a central defender for São Paulo FC, Santos FC and the Brazil national team.

Regarded as one of the best Brazilian centre backs of all time, he was praised throughout his career for his aerial ability and tackling.

Italian sports journalist Gianni Brera believed Mauro to be the best sweeper in the history of the game.

Club career
Born in Poços de Caldas, Minas Gerais, Mauro began his career playing for amateur clubs in his hometown in the 1940s. Notably representing Caldense, he joined São Paulo FC in 1948 from Sanjoanense.

Signed as a replacement to club idol Armando Renganeschi, Mauro immediately became a starter and relegated Renganeschi to the bench. He represented the club in 489 matches, scoring two goals.

Ahead of the 1960 season, Mauro moved to Santos FC for a fee of five million cruzeiros. He was also a first-choice at his new club, being a part of the team who was widely known as ''Os Santásticos'.

In 1967, Mauro moved abroad for the first time in his career and joined Mexican side Toluca. He retired with the club in the following year, aged 38, due to a groin injury.

International career
Mauro received 28 caps with the Brazil national team. He was an unplaying member of the Brazil squad at the 1954 World Cup. He was also an unplaying member of the squad that won the 1958 World Cup. At the 1962 World Cup he finally made his World Cup debut and as team captain he lifted the World Cup Trophy after victory in the final over Czechoslovakia.

Managerial career
After starting it out at C.D. Oro, Mauro was appointed manager of Santos in 1971. He left the club in the following year.

Mauro also took over Coritiba in 1971 and 1984.

Death
Mauro died on 18 September 2002, due to an intestinal cancer.

Honours

Club
Taça Brasil: 1961, 1962, 1963, 1964, 1965
Copa Libertadores: 1962, 1963
Intercontinental Cup: 1962, 1963
Campeonato Paulista: 1948, 1949, 1953, 1957, 1960, 1961, 1962, 1964, 1965
Torneio Rio–São Paulo: 1963, 1964, 1966
Mexican Primera División: 1967–68
Small Club World Cup: 1955

International
Brazil
FIFA World Cup: 1958, 1962
Copa America: 1949
Roca Cup: 1963

References

External links

1930 births
2002 deaths
Sportspeople from Minas Gerais
Brazilian footballers
Association football central defenders
São Paulo FC players
Santos FC players
Deportivo Toluca F.C. players
1954 FIFA World Cup players
1958 FIFA World Cup players
1962 FIFA World Cup players
Copa Libertadores-winning players
FIFA World Cup-winning players
FIFA World Cup-winning captains
Brazil international footballers
Brazilian football managers
Santos FC managers
Coritiba Foot Ball Club managers
Brazilian expatriate footballers
Brazilian expatriate sportspeople in Mexico
Expatriate footballers in Mexico
Deaths from cancer in Minas Gerais